Zhao Jianbo (born 27 August 2003) is a Chinese former professional snooker player. 

Zhao is among ten Chinese players currently suspended from World Snooker Tour events amid a match-fixing investigation. In January 2023, the WPBSA charged him with fixing a match.

Career 
As a result of Zhao's performances on the CBSA Tour, he was awarded a two-year card on the World Snooker Tour for the 2020–21 and 2021–22.

Performance and rankings timeline

Career finals

Pro-am finals: 1

Amateur finals: 2 (2 titles)

References 

Living people
Chinese snooker players
2003 births
21st-century Chinese people